Naz Durakoğlu is a Turkish-American foreign policy and national security advisor who is the assistant secretary of state for legislative affairs.

Early life and education 
Durakoğlu is first generation Turkish-American. She earned a bachelor of arts degree in psychology and philosophy from Rutgers University and a master of arts degree in national security and strategic studies from the Naval War College.

Career 
From 2007 to 2008, Durakoğlu worked on the national advance staff of the Hillary Clinton 2008 presidential primary campaign. She then worked as deputy finance director for Michael McMahon's 2008 campaign for New York's 13th congressional district. From 2009 to 2011, she served as McMahon's legislative assistant. Also in 2011, she served as a legislative assistant for Congressman Anthony Weiner. From 2011 to 2015, she was the legislative director for Congressman Bill Keating. From 2013 to 2015, she was the staff director for the United States House Foreign Affairs Subcommittee on Europe, Energy, the Environment and Emerging Threats. From 2015 to 2017, she served as a senior advisor in the Bureau of European and Eurasian Affairs. She later worked for the Digital Forensic Research Lab, a program founded in 2016 as a part of the Atlantic Council. From 2017 to 2021, she served as national security advisor for Senator Jeanne Shaheen. In January 2021, she was selected to serve as deputy assistant secretary of state for legislative affairs and acting secretary before being appointed permanently to the position on July 22, 2022.

Personal life
Durakoğlu speaks Turkish.

References 

Living people
Rutgers University alumni
Naval War College alumni
Biden administration personnel
United States Department of State officials
Obama administration personnel
Year of birth missing (living people)
American people of Turkish descent